Gabriela Rivero Abaroa (born September 15, 1964 in Mexico City, Mexico), better known as Gaby Rivero, is an actress and singer. Best remembered for portraying Maestra Jimena (character played in telenovelas Carrusel and Carrusel de las Américas).

Biography 

Gabriela Rivero Abaroa was born on September 15, 1964 in Mexico City. She is the daughter of Maria de Lourdes Abaroa and Mario Rivero. She began her career as a model and dancer. In 1984 she hosted the children's show Xe-Tu with René Casados, also guest-starring in the La Hora del Gane show. Afterwards she was cast in several telenovelas such as El camino secreto (costarring Daniela Romo), Carrusel (with Augusto Benedico), Al filo de la muerte (with Humberto Zurita), among others. She was the host of the Gaby's Club (El Club de Gaby) show in 1993, after recording a children's album which achieved great success. In 1994 she starred in the movie Una Maestra con Angel in 1994 and worked in several plays such as The Magic Carousel, The Wizard of Oz, Don Juan Tenorio (a play that Gonzalo Vega stages every year) between others. She has released three albums: El club de Gaby, Imaginación, El club de Gaby. Al rescate and Ellas cantan a Cricri.

Rivero took part in the Despierta América variety show based in Miami, where she lived for several years after marrying photographer Luis Francisco Ricote on June 12, 1993. The couple has three daughters: Gala, Lara and Maya.

Gabriela Rivero gained international fame in the late 1980s, with the television series Carrusel, where she played the role of teacher Ms. Jimena. This story was also broadcast in Brazil. After playing the part of Mariela in the telenovela Al filo de la muerte, she reprised her role as Ms. Jimena in the television series Carrusel de las Américas (1992), a program created for the Quincentennial of the Discovery of America 1992. In 1997, she stars in the telenovela Sin Ti (telenovela) where she shares credits with René Strickler and seven years afterwards she returned to Mexican telenovelas starring in Corazones al límite where she plays Sonia. In 2005 she played Lucrecia in Piel de Otoño and in 2007 she plays Fortunata in Pasión, a spinster devoted to gossiping among the neighbors. She shares credits with Fernando Colunga and Susana Gonzalez in addition to her daughter Maya, all the telenovelas were originally broadcast by El Canal de las Estrellas of Televisa.

Currently hosts the show Necesito una amiga, with co-host Mimi Lazo, in which they address letters from people who request the help of a friend. the show is remembered for the catchphrase: if you need a friend, here you have two. The show is broadcast by Univision.

Filmography

Theater 
El carrusel mágico ... Maestra Jimena (1989)
 Don Juan Tenorio ... Dona Ines (Next to Gonzalo Vega)
 The Wizard of Oz ... Dorothy

Movies 
Una maestra con Ángel (1994) .... Andrea Miranda (with Gonzalo Vega and Alma Delfina)

Awards and nominations

Awards TVyNovelas

Music albums 
 'Club Gaby, Imagination Imagination
 The Club Gaby
 I am a Taco
 Word Search
 Hello
 Story: "Jimmy and Ivory Cormillo"
 Don Paco Wheels
 Read a Book
 My Friend the Dinosaur
 Story: "Estrellina"
 I Taste So
 In the Middle of Dreams
 Imagination

 'Club Gaby, To the Rescue'''

 Overture [Medley Album "Imagination"]
 Jazz Traffic Jam
 A Beautiful Place
 Fly
 Tale Monarch: "The Butterfly"
 Hip Hop In The Colors
 Story: "Abelina, The Bee Dancer"
 The giggle
 Zoo (City Zoo)
 The Rescue
 The Planets
 For Always (Song Gala)
 The Club Gaby 'They sing Cricri

 The Raton Vaquero ... Vaselines (They)
 It rains ... Mariana Garza
 Say Why ... Bibi Gaytan
 Caminito School ... Kabah (They)
 The junkman ... Alejandra Guzman
 The Hunt ... Alix
 The Maquinita ... Aracely Arambula
 Dance of the Puppets ... Anahi
 The Phone ... Lissette 'The Dog ... Gaby Rivero'' '
 The Patita ... Angelica Vale
 Mice Walkers ... Yvette and Yvonne
 Song of The Witches ... Calo (They)

References

External links 

1964 births
Actresses from Mexico City
Mexican television actresses
Mexican female dancers
Mexican female models
Living people